SouthWest Radio Ltd (or SWR) owned and operated radio stations in Wiltshire and Somerset in the South West of England. The company was founded in 2008 and was based in Exeter, Devon in the United Kingdom.

Stations owned

Bath FM which serves Bath.
Brunel FM which serves Swindon/North Wiltshire.
QuayWest 107.4 which serve Bridgwater.
QuayWest 102.4fm which serves West Somerset.
107.5 3TR FM which serves Warminster, Westbury & Frome.

History
In early August 2009, South West Radio went into administration after it was declared insolvent, less than a year after Bath FM's previous owner, Laser Broadcasting, went under. Insolvency practitioners Kirk Hills were put in charge of looking for a buyer in order to safeguard the stations' futures.

The owner of another local radio group, Star Radio Cheltenham, took the licences over and rebranded to Total Star.

References

External links
South West Radio website
SWR Media UK listing
Wage backlog at Bath FM
 Bath FM, Brunel FM, 3TR and the 2 Quaywest stations to be sold? 
Bath FM and Brunel FM receive ‘yellow card’ warnings
Bath FM in breach of advertising code

Radio broadcasting companies of the United Kingdom
Mass media in Exeter
Companies based in Exeter